Paolo e Francesca (Paolo and Francesca), also known as Legend of Love, is a 1950 Italian historical melodrama film directed by Raffaello Matarazzo and starring Odile Versois and Armando Francioli. It is loosely based on real life events of Paolo Malatesta and Francesca da Polenta.

Plot  
Italy, 13th century. Two families have just restored peace thanks to the marriage of Gianciotto Malatesta with the beautiful Francesca. Before the wedding, Malatesta sends his brother Paolo to his bride, who inevitably falls in love with Francesca. Theirs is a doomed love because it is immediately discovered by Malatesta, who kills the two lovers out of jealousy.

Cast 
Odile Versois as Francesca
Armando Francioli as Paolo Malatesta
Andrea Checchi as  Gianciotto Malatesta
Aldo Silvani as The Astrologer
Roberto Murolo as  The Court Jester
Sergio Fantoni
Enzo Musumeci Greco as  Captain  Manfredo
Nino Marchesini as  Count Giulio Ilovello
Angela Lavagna as  The Mother Badessa

References

External links

1950s historical drama films
Italian historical drama films
Italian romantic drama films
Films directed by Raffaello Matarazzo
1950 drama films
1950 films
Films scored by Alessandro Cicognini
Melodrama films
Italian black-and-white films
Cultural depictions of Francesca da Rimini
Films set in the 13th century
Films set in Italy
1950s Italian films
1950s Italian-language films